Cave Creek is a town in Maricopa County, Arizona, United States. It is part of the Phoenix metropolitan area. As of the 2020 census, the population of the town was 4,892.

History
Cave Creek was settled in 1870 by soldiers on horseback from Fort McDowell. In 1873, prospectors from the Bradshaw Mountains found gold in the town. The town is named for the cave next to the creek the town was founded on.

Geography
Cave Creek is a town in the Sonoran Desert. It sits in northern Maricopa County on the northern edge of Paradise Valley, with mountains rising to the north that eventually connect with the New River Mountains and the Black Hills. The town is bordered to the east by the town of Carefree, to the west by unincorporated New River, and to the north by Tonto National Forest. Local landmark Black Mountain, elevation , is in the southern part of town on the border with Carefree.

Cave Creek flows through the western side of the town southward into Phoenix, where it disappears into the Salt River valley.

In 2000, the state of Arizona, Maricopa County, and the town of Cave Creek bought Spur Cross Ranch, a  tract of Sonoran desert just north of Phoenix, for $21 million. It had unusual cacti, stone formations, and hundreds of pre-historic Hohokam Indian tribal artifacts, and is now a Maricopa County park.

Climate
Cave Creek is located in a semi-arid climate, receiving more rainfall than a desert climate. Cave Creek is at a higher elevation, and therefore is cooler than the lower elevations of the Phoenix area. The hot season lasts for 3.5 months, from May 31 to September 19, with an average daily high temperature at or above .

The cool season lasts for 3.4 months, from November 20 to March 1, with an average daily high temperature below .

In July-September, the North American monsoon season brings rain and thunderstorms to the Cave Creek area. The wettest month of the year is August, with an average of 6 days of rain, and averaging .

Demographics

As of the census of 2000, there were 3,728 people, 1,571 households, and 1,101 families residing in the town. The racial makeup of the town was 95.0% White, <0.1% Black or African American, 0.2% Native American, 0.4% Asian, 0.1% Pacific Islander, 2.6% from other races, and 1.5% from two or more races. Hispanic or Latino of any race were 7.0% of the population.

Out of the 1,571 households some 27.1% had children under the age of 18 living with them, 59.0% were married couples living together, 7.4% had a female householder with no husband present, and 29.9% were non-families. 24.3% of all households were made up of individuals, and 6.2% had someone living alone who was 65 years of age or older.  The average household size was 2.37 and the average family size was 2.80.

In the town, the population was spread out, with 20.9% under the age of 18, 5.5% from 18 to 24, 24.2% from 25 to 44, 36.1% from 45 to 64, and 13.3% who were 65 years of age or older.  The median age was 45 years. For every 100 females, there were 100.1 males.  For every 100 females age 18 and over, there were 97.5 males.

The median income for a household in the town was $59,938, and the median income for a family was $76,549. Males had a median income of $50,399 versus $31,607 for females. The per capita income for the town was $38,070.  About 6.0% of families and 7.7% of the population were below the poverty line, including 12.9% of those under age 18 and 7.3% of those age 65 or over.

Arts and culture
Historic properties located at the Cave Creek Museum include the Tubercular Cabin (listed on the National Register of Historic Places (NRHP)), the First Church of Cave Creek, and Golden Reef Stamp Mill.  Two historic properties have been converted into restaurants: the Cave Creek Inn, and the Cave Creek Service Station (listed on NRHP).  Another location, Frontier Town, has some of Cave Creek's original structures.

Every year the  Sonoran Arts League holds an open studio event involving approximately 40 artists home in the area of Cave Creek, "Hidden in the Hills".

Government
In June 2009, Cave Creek attracted media attention when a game of chance was used to break a tie in a vote for Town Council. The drawing of playing cards led to the victory of 25-year-old law student Adam Trenk over incumbent Town Council member Thomas McGuire. The Arizona State Constitution allows a game of chance to be used to break ties.

"Where the Wild West Lives" was adopted as the town motto by the Cave Creek Town Council during a November 2013 meeting.

Education
The portion of Cave Creek west of longitude 111°59'44.21"W is served by Deer Valley Unified School District, and the remainder of the town is served by Cave Creek Unified School District.

Infrastructure

Transportation
Cave Creek residents use Phoenix Sky Harbor International Airport or Mesa Gateway Airport to fly on commercial airlines. Deer Valley Airport, the closest airport to Cave Creek, is a very active general aviation airport.

Cave Creek is not a member of Valley Metro and Cave Creek does not have local bus service.

The junction of Cave Creek Road and Carefree Highway is located at the south edge of Cave Creek.

Notable people
 Sonny Barger, founder of the Oakland chapter of the Hells Angels
 Brian Dales, singer of The Summer Set
 Shane Doan, NHL player for the Arizona Coyotes
 Kiowa Gordon, actor
 David Henrie, actor
 Taylor Lewan, NFL player for Tennessee Titans, drafted in 2014
 Earl Simmons, the rapper and actor DMX
 Dee Dee Wood, Emmy Award-winning choreographer

Gallery

See also

 Cave Creek Complex Wildfire
 List of historic properties in Cave Creek, Arizona
 List of municipalities in Arizona

References

External links

 
 "That Cave Creek Movie" (YouTube)

Towns in Maricopa County, Arizona
Phoenix metropolitan area
Populated places established in 1986